Bello Dan Maliki (1887 – 1926) was the 8th Etsu Nupe King of Nupe from 1916 to 1926.

In 1918 he was the first monarch to bought a car as of the time road was not constructed in Bida and all community in Nigeria and the emirate  benefited from the car.

He belong to the Usman Zaki ruling house of Fulani Nupe rulings dynasty.

Further reading 
The Nupe and their creed, Sir Nigfred, German institute of linguistic, Germany. 1957

Notes 

Etsu Nupe
Emirs of Bida
1887 births
1926 deaths
Nigerian traditional rulers